Albert Thomas "Sam" Earl (10 February 1915 – 2000) was an English professional footballer who played as an inside forward or a winger in the Football League for Bury, York City, Stockport County, Rochdale and New Brighton, in non-League football for Dunston CWS, Rhyl Athletic and Northwich Victoria and was on the books of Hartlepools United without making a league appearance.

References

1915 births
Footballers from Gateshead
2000 deaths
English footballers
Association football forwards
Bury F.C. players
Rhyl F.C. players
York City F.C. players
Hartlepool United F.C. players
Stockport County F.C. players
Rochdale A.F.C. players
New Brighton A.F.C. players
Northwich Victoria F.C. players
Rochdale A.F.C. wartime guest players
English Football League players